The prix Jean-Ricard is a prize awarded by the Société française de physique (SFP) to a French physicist for remarkable and original work. Jean Ricard, alumnus of École Polytechnique, engineer École supérieure d'électricité (E.S.E), and member of the SFP since 1925, donated to the SFP in April 1970 a portfolio of securities amounting to around four million francs to found the prize. The prize has been awarded each year since 1971.

List of laureates

 1971 Claude Cohen-Tannoudji
 1972 Claude Bloch
 1973 Georges Charpak
 1974 Jacques Winter
 1975 Paul Musset
 1976 Georges Slodzian
 1977 Roger Balian
 1978 Michel Hénon
 1979 Albert Libchaber
 1980 Maurice Kléman
 1981 Paul Henri Rebut
 1982 Étienne Guyon
 1983 Serge Haroche
 1984 Jean Iliopoulos
 1985 Jacques Villain
 1986 Yves Pomeau
 1987 Cirano de Dominicis
 1988 Joseph Rémilleux
 1989 Jean-Loup Puget
 1990 Marcel Banner
 1991 Dominique Vautherin
 1992 Raymond Stora
 1993 Guy Laval
 1994 Albert Fert
 1995 Jacques Prost
 1996 Gilbert Grynberg
 1997 Jean-Paul Blaizot
 1998 Françoise Brochard-Wyart
 1999 Denis Gratias
 2000 Jean Dalibard
 2001 Yves Declay
 2002 Jacques Meunier
 2003 Alain Benoit
 2004 Alain Blondel
 2005 Yannick Mellier
 2006 Élisabeth Charlaix
 2007 Jean-Michel Raimond
 2008 Philippe Grangier
 2009 Patrick Bruno
 2010 Gilles Chabrier
 2011 Daniel Fournier
 2012 Sébastien Balibar
 2013 Daniel Esteve
 2014 Guillaume Unal
 2015 Jacqueline Bloch
 2016 Jean-Yves Bigot
 2017 Anne-Marie Lagrange
 2018 Hubert Saleur
 2019 Xavier Marie
 2020 Luc Blanchet
 2021 Aleksandra Walczak
 2022 Jacky Even

References

French science and technology awards
Physics awards
Awards established in 1971